Bia alienata is a species of flowering plant in the spurge family, Euphorbiaceae. It is native to Brazil, Bolivia, Paraguay and northern Argentina.

References 

alienata
Flora of South America